Mario Antoine Butler (born October 20, 1988) is a former American football cornerback in the National Football League (NFL) for the Dallas Cowboys, Denver Broncos and Buffalo Bills. He played college football at the Georgia Institute of Technology.

Early years
Butler attended Allen D. Nease High School in Ponte Vedra, FL and was coached by Craig Howard, who helped lead his team to the Class 4-A state title game in his final year of high school. Tim Tebow was quarterback of the team.

He received a number of accolades in his final year of high school which include:
No. 34 cornerback in the nation by Rivals.com
No. 62 overall prospect in Florida by Scout.com
No. 73 overall prospect in Florida by SuperPrep.com
No. 76 overall prospect in Florida by Rivals.com
Orlando Sentinel's Top 100 in Florida

College career
Butler accepted a football scholarship from the Georgia Institute of Technology. He became a starter as a sophomore, registering 41 tackles and
one interception. The next year, he posted 45 tackles and 2 interceptions.

As a senior, he collected 47 tackles and one interception. He finished his career with 51 games (39 starts), 136 tackles, 4 interceptions and 12 passes defensed.

Professional career

Dallas Cowboys
Butler signed as an undrafted free agent with the Dallas Cowboys after the 2011 NFL draft. He was waived on September 3 and signed to the practice squad two days later. On January 3, 2012, he was promoted to the active roster.

He was released on September 22, 2012. He was re-signed to the practice squad on September 26. He was released on October 16.

Denver Broncos
On October 30, 2012, he was signed by the Denver Broncos to their practice squad. He was released on August 25, 2013.

Buffalo Bills
On November 19, 2013, Butler was signed by the Buffalo Bills to their practice squad. On August 29, 2014, he was placed on the injured reserve list with an ankle injury.

In 2015, he made the team, playing on special teams and as a backup cornerback. On January 4, 2016, the Bills signed him to a contract extension.

On September 2, 2016, Butler was released by the Bills as part of final roster cuts.

Calgary Stampeders
On August 15, 2017, he was signed by the Calgary Stampeders to the practice roster. He was placed on the retired list on September 20.

Personal life
Butler is the son of Lisa Lockwood and Jeffrey Butler.

References

External links
Buffalo Bills bio

1988 births
Living people
People from St. Johns County, Florida
Players of American football from Florida
African-American players of American football
American football cornerbacks
Georgia Tech Yellow Jackets football players
Dallas Cowboys players
Denver Broncos players
Buffalo Bills players
Calgary Stampeders players
21st-century African-American sportspeople
20th-century African-American people